The International Solar Alliance (ISA) is an alliance of 123 signatory countries, most being sunshine countries, which lie either completely or partly between the Tropic of Cancer and the Tropic of Capricorn. The primary objective of the alliance is to work for efficient consumption of solar energy to reduce dependence on fossil fuels. This initiative was first proposed by Indian Prime Minister Narendra Modi in a speech in November 2015 at Wembley Stadium (London HA9 0WS, United Kingdom), in which he referred to sunshine countries as Suryaputra ("Sons of the Sun").  The alliance is a treaty-based inter-governmental organization. Countries that do not fall within the Tropics can join the alliance and enjoy all benefits as other members, with the exception of voting rights.

The initiative was launched by Prime Minister Narendra Modi at the India Africa Summit, and a meeting of member countries ahead of the 2015 United Nations Climate Change Conference in Paris in November 2015. The framework agreement of the International Solar Alliance opened for signatures in Marrakesh, Morocco, in November 2016, and 102 countries have joined.

Headquarters
The ISA is headquartered in Haryana, India. In January 2016, Narendra Modi, and the then French President François Hollande jointly laid the foundation stone of the ISA Headquarters and inaugurated the interim Secretariat at the National Institute of Solar Energy (NISE) in Gwal Pahari, Gurugram, India. The Indian government has dedicated five acres of land on the NISE campus for its future headquarters; it also has contributed  to the fund to build a campus and for meeting expenditures for the first five years.

The alliance is also called International Agency for Solar Policy and Application (IASPA).

Objective
The focus is on solar power utilization. The launching of such an alliance in Paris also sends a strong signal to the global communities about the sincerity of the developing nations towards their concern about climate change and to switch to a low-carbon growth path. India has pledged a target of installing 175 GW of renewable energy of which 100 GW will be solar energy by 2022 and reduction in emission intensity by 33–35% by 2030 to let solar energy reach to the most unconnected villages and communities and also towards creating a clean planet. India's pledge to the Paris summit offered to bring 40% of its electricity generation capacity (not actual production) from non-fossil sources (renewable, large hydro, and nuclear) by 2030.
It is based on world cooperation.

Geographical importance
The area of Earth located in between the Tropic of Cancer and Tropic of Capricorn is called the tropical (torrid) zone. This is the part of the world in which the sun can appear directly overhead, and that more-direct exposure means that the sun's actual effect is greater here; anywhere north or south of this zone, sunlight always reaches the earth's surface at an angle and is correspondingly less intense. The sunniest countries of the world are on the African continent, ranging from Somalia- Horn of Africa-, east to Niger, west and north to Egypt.

For India, possible additional benefits from the alliance can be a strengthening of ties with the major African countries and increasing goodwill for India among them.

Members
The alliance is a treaty-based inter-governmental organization. The framework agreement of the International Solar Alliance opened for signatures in Marrakech, Morocco, in November 2016, on the sidelines of the Marrakech Climate Change Conference (the twenty-second session of the Conference of the Parties, or COP 22). On its first day (15 November), sixteen countries signed the Agreement: India, Brazil, the Democratic Republic of Congo, the Dominican Republic, the Republic of Guinea, Mali; Nauru; Niger; Tanzania; Tuvalu; Cambodia; Ethiopia; Burkina Faso; Bangladesh and Madagascar. By 17 November, Guinea Bissau, Fiji, France also signed the agreement. 
On 6 November 2017 India's External Affairs Minister Sushma Swaraj held a meeting with Guinea's Foreign Minister, Mamady Toure. During the course of this meeting, Mamady Toure handed over Guinea's Instrument of Accession to the India-initiated International Solar Alliance (ISA).
Vanuatu and Liberia also signed the agreement.

Subsequently, an additional 107 countries joined the agreement, including many major countries that lie between the tropics of Cancer and Capricorn, including Mexico, Peru, Chile, Paraguay, Brazil, India, Argentina, and Australia. A conclave started from 30 November 2015 for the sunshine grouping, called the InSPA (International Agency for Solar Policy & Application).

Parties who have signed/ratified the framework of ISA
The following countries are the prospective members of this alliance who have signed the framework. Countries marked with a plus have also ratified the framework. Afghanistan, Bahrain, Barbados, Belarus, Belgium, Belize, Bhutan, Botswana, Brunei Darussalam, Bulgaria, Cameroon, Congo, Denmark, El Salvador, Finland, Grenada, Guatemala, Haiti, Ireland, Italy, Jamaica, Liberia, Luxembourg, Maldives, Marshall Islands, Morocco, Myanmar, Nicaragua, Oman, Paraguay, Philippines, Romania, Saint Lucia, Saint Vincent and the Grenadines, Samoa, Thailand, Trinidad and Tobago and Brazil is the newest member of this alliance.
Greece and Israel formally joined ISA on 26 June 2021 and 18 October 2021 respectively.

List of Member Countries

 Afghanistan + (Position unclear after Taliban takeover)
 +
 +

 +
 +

 +
 +

 +
 +
 +

 +
 +
 +
 +
 +
 +
 +
 +

 +
 +
 +
 +
 +
 +
 +
 +
 +
 +
 +
 +

 +
 +
 +
 +
 +

 +
 +
 +
 +
 +

 +
 +
 +
 +
 +
 +
 +
 +
 +
 +
 +
 +
 +
 +
 +
 +
 +
 +
 +
 +
 +
 +
 +
 +
 +
  +
 +

 +

 +
 +
 +
 +
 +
 +
 +
 +
 +
 +
 +
 +
 +
 +
 +

 +
 +
 +
 +
 +
 +
  +
 +
 +
 +
 +
 +

Apart from these, there are 58 other members, making a total of 124 members to the alliance. Recently, Israel, Greece, and the United States joined the International Solar Alliance, thus membership rose to 100. Antigua & Barbados joined on 7 Jan 2022. Syria joined in February 2022 to become the 103rd member. Later Angola joined to raise the total to 104 signatories. Nepal has also joined the ISA, which has raised the total membership to 105.

Initiatives and partnerships 

The alliance has partnered with World Bank to launch Global Solar Atlas at an ISA event at the World Future Energy Summit in Abu Dhabi. Global Solar Atlas is a free online tool that displays annual average solar power potential at any location in the world and thus identify potential sites for solar power generation. The World Bank announced, "This tool will help governments save millions of dollars on their own research and provide investors and solar developers with an easily accessible and uniform platform to compare resource potential between sites in one region or across multiple countries."

Riccardo Puliti, Senior Director and Head of the World Bank's Energy & Extractives Global Practice said "The World Bank is seeing a surge of interest from our clients in solar power as a result of the dramatic cost decreases over the past few years. We hope that the Global Solar Atlas will help inform the crucial planning and investment decisions that will need to be taken over the next decade to shift to more sustainable forms of energy."

Future targets 
India, with the support of France, has invited nations to facilitate infrastructure for implementation of solar projects. The alliance has committed one trillion dollars as investment, and it is committed to making the costs of solar power more affordable for remote and inaccessible communities. The alliance will endorse India in achieving its goal of generating 100 GW of solar energy and 175 GW of renewable energy by 2022. The countries shall support each other in research and development as well as other high level activities.

It is also seen as an alliance by the developing countries to form a united front and to undertake research and development for making solar power equipment within developing countries.

Progress
On 30 June 2016, the alliance entered into an understanding with the World Bank for accelerating mobilization of finance for solar energy. The Bank will have a major role in mobilizing more than US$1 trillion in investments that will be needed by 2030, to meet ISA's goals for the massive deployment of affordable solar energy.

To date 74 countries have signed and 52 countries have ratified the Framework Agreement of the ISA. With ratifications by 15 countries, the ISA will become a treaty based inter-governmental international organisation and it will be recognized by UN legally to become fully functionable.

At the World Future Energy Summit (WFES) held in Abu Dhabi in January 2018, the government of India announced the establishment of a $350 million solar development fund to enable financing of solar projects.

See also
 Global Centre for Nuclear Energy Partnership, Bahadurgarh
 International Renewable Energy Alliance
 Solar power in India

References

External links 
 International Solar Alliance official website
 2015 United Nations Climate Change Conference
Global Solar Atlas

Economic country classifications
Solar energy organizations
Organizations established in 2015
International renewable energy organizations
2015 in international relations
Foreign relations of India